Interstate 180 may refer to:

 Interstate 180 (California), a temporary designation used in 1978 for the Richmond–San Rafael Bridge in the San Francisco Bay Area in California that is now part of Interstate 580
 Interstate 180 (Illinois), a short spur in rural Putnam and Bureau counties in northern Illinois
 Interstate 180 (Nebraska), a spur in Lincoln, Nebraska
 Interstate 180 (Pennsylvania), a spur to Williamsport, Pennsylvania
 Interstate 180 (Wyoming), a short, non-freeway spur in Cheyenne, Wyoming
 Interstate 176 to Reading, Pennsylvania, designated as Interstate 180 when I-76 was I-80S

1
80-1